Harold Bowley (15 March 1909 – 1978) was a South African cricketer. He played in fourteen first-class matches for Border from 1929/30 to 1939/40.

See also
 List of Border representative cricketers

References

External links
 

1909 births
1978 deaths
South African cricketers
Border cricketers